Ehinomen Ehikhamenor (born 1 April 1980) is a Nigerian professional boxer who fights in the cruiserweight division.

Professional career
Ehikhamenor turned professional in February 2004 at the Mohegan Sun Casino, Connecticut, U.S.. In his debut Ehikhamenor defeated Moorish  American Anthony Riddick by way of a first round knockout.

Contender
Ehinomen was a contestant on the 4th season of The Contender filmed in Singapore.  On 7 January 2009 he won his first round fight with a five round points victory over experience Darnell Wilson. After winning two more fights beating Deon Elam in the quarters and Rico Hoye in the semi-final, Ehikhamenor secured a spot in the championship match, in which he will battle Troy Amos-Ross.

Ehikhamenor lost to Troy Ross in The Contender championship bout.

Personal life
Ehikhamenor was raised in LeFrak City apartments in New York City. He attended John Bowne High School.

Professional boxing record

|-
|align="center" colspan=8|15 Wins (7 knockouts, 8 decisions), 4 Losses (1 knockout, 3 decisions) 
|-
| align="center" style="border-style: none none solid solid; background: #e3e3e3"|Result
| align="center" style="border-style: none none solid solid; background: #e3e3e3"|Record
| align="center" style="border-style: none none solid solid; background: #e3e3e3"|Opponent
| align="center" style="border-style: none none solid solid; background: #e3e3e3"|Type
| align="center" style="border-style: none none solid solid; background: #e3e3e3"|Round
| align="center" style="border-style: none none solid solid; background: #e3e3e3"|Date
| align="center" style="border-style: none none solid solid; background: #e3e3e3"|Location
| align="center" style="border-style: none none solid solid; background: #e3e3e3"|Notes
|-align=center
|Loss
|
|align=left| Troy Ross
|TKO
|4
|25/02/2009
|align=left| Foxwoods, Mashantucket, Connecticut, U.S.
|align=left|
|-
|Win
|
|align=left| Rico Hoye
|UD
|5
|18/02/2009
|align=left| Singapore
|align=left|
|-
|Win
|
|align=left| Deon Elam
|UD
|5
|11/02/2009
|align=left| Singapore
|align=left|
|-
|Win
|
|align=left| Darnell Wilson
|UD
|5
|07/01/2009
|align=left| Singapore
|align=left|
|-
|Loss
|
|align=left| Herbie Hide
|UD
|12
|30/05/2008
|align=left| Pabellon Lasesarre, Baracaldo, Spain
|align=left|
|-
|Win
|
|align=left| Zack Page
|UD
|6
|01/02/2008
|align=left| Expo Mart, Monroeville, Pennsylvania, U.S.
|align=left|
|-
|Loss
|
|align=left| Daniel Stuckey
|UD
|6
|21/10/2005
|align=left| Mohegan Sun Casino, Uncasville, Connecticut, U.S.
|align=left|
|-
|Loss
|
|align=left| Patrick Nwamu
|UD
|10
|04/08/2005
|align=left| The Grand Ballroom, New York City, U.S.
|align=left|
|-
|Win
|
|align=left| John Douglas
|UD
|6
|09/06/2005
|align=left| The Grand Ballroom, New York City, U.S.
|align=left|
|-
|Win
|
|align=left| Kevin Miller
|TKO
|2
|15/04/2005
|align=left| The Hoops, Columbus, Ohio, U.S.
|align=left|
|-
|Win
|
|align=left| Mark Miller
|KO
|4
|18/11/2004
|align=left| Manhattan Center, New York City, U.S.
|align=left|
|-
|Win
|
|align=left| Charles Brown
|TKO
|2
|30/09/2004
|align=left| The Grand Ballroom, New York City, U.S.
|align=left|
|-
|Win
|
|align=left| John Battle
|TKO
|3
|27/08/2004
|align=left| Mohegan Sun Casino, Uncasville, Connecticut, U.S.
|align=left|
|-
|Win
|
|align=left| Gary Gomez
|UD
|6
|30/07/2004
|align=left| Mohegan Sun Casino, Uncasville, Connecticut, U.S.
|align=left|
|-
|Win
|
|align=left| Sameh Elashry
|UD
|4
|24/06/2004
|align=left| Manhattan Center, New York City, U.S.
|align=left|
|-
|Win
|
|align=left| Scott Halton
|TKO
|1
|28/05/2004
|align=left| Mohegan Sun Casino, Uncasville, Connecticut, U.S.
|align=left|
|-
|Win
|
|align=left| Robert Mosley
|UD
|4
|22/04/2004
|align=left| The Grand Ballroom, New York City, U.S.
|align=left|
|-
|Win
|
|align=left| Miguel Reyes
|TKO
|2
|19/03/2004
|align=left| Olympic Theater, New York City, U.S.
|align=left|
|-
|Win
|
|align=left| Anthony Riddick
|TKO
|1
|13/02/2004
|align=left| Mohegan Sun Casino, Uncasville, Connecticut, U.S.
|align=left|
|}

References

External links
 
 

Living people
1980 births
The Contender (TV series) participants
Nigerian male boxers
People from Queens, New York
Cruiserweight boxers